Wainhill Crossing Halt was a halt on the Watlington and Princes Risborough Railway which the Great Western Railway opened in 1925 to serve the Oxfordshire hamlet of Wainhill. The opening of the halt was part of a GWR attempt to encourage more passengers on the line at a time when competition from bus services was drawing away patronage.

History
Opened in 1925, the halt - the last station to open on the line - sought to encourage passenger traffic in the face of increased competition from buses. It was situated to the south of a level crossing over an unclassified road leading to Lower Wainhill and Hempton Wainhill. The lane saw very occasional traffic as it was unsuitable for motor vehicles and only served nine or ten houses on the eastern side of the Watlington and Princes Risborough Railway. A modest crossing keeper's cottage had been provided by the railway company which comprised two ground floor rooms and one bedroom on the first floor; there was no mains water, gas or electricity. The crossing keeper was responsible for keeping the lamps alight on the gates and, once the station had opened, trimming and lighting the two oil hurricane lamps hung on posts to illuminate the single platform.

Following the withdrawal of passenger services in 1957, the line through Wainhill Crossing remained open until July 1990 for the purposes of coal, gypsum and cement movements to and from the Rugby Portland Cement Company's factory near Chinnor. Negotiating Wainhill Crossing, by this time unstaffed, required trains to be brought to a halt by the crossing whilst a crew member opened and closed the gates; this was particularly awkward as the line descends at a 1 in 73 gradient here and was subject to a speed restriction of 5 mph.

Present day 
Wainhill Crossing Halt has been rebuilt by the Chinnor and Princes Risborough Railway which has reopened the line through the station. The halt is not however open to passengers. Wainhill Crossing is staffed when services are running and a train must stop or slow down unless a green flag is shown by the crossing keeper. In accordance with the Transport and Works Order granted to the CPRR for the operation of services, the crossing gates must be kept closed and locked across the railway except when services are crossing. The gates must also be kept conspicuously white with red reflectors and lamps must be used when it gets dark. The crossing keeper's cottage is still standing and is in private ownership.

References

Sources

External links 
 Station on navigable 1946 O.S. map
 Image of the station in 1957

Disused railway stations in Oxfordshire
Former Great Western Railway stations
Railway stations in Great Britain opened in 1925
Railway stations in Great Britain closed in 1957